Macy's, Inc. (originally Federated Department Stores, Inc.) is an American conglomerate holding company. Upon its establishment, Federated held ownership of the regional department store chains Abraham & Straus, Lazarus, Filene's, and Shillito's. Bloomingdale's joined Federated Department Stores the following year. Throughout its early history, frequent acquisitions and divestitures saw the company operate a number of nameplates. In 1994, Federated took over the department store chain Macy's. With the acquisition of The May Department Stores Company in 2005, the regional nameplates were retired and replaced by the Macy's and Bloomingdale's brands nationwide by 2006. Ultimately, Federated itself was renamed Macy's, Inc. in 2007.

Macy's, Inc., has been headquartered within Macy's Herald Square in New York City since 2020; beforehand, its headquarters was in Cincinnati, Ohio. While Federated had a long history of preserving brand identities in each of their markets since its inception in 1929, it universally applied the Macy's name to most their department store chains in 2006. It operates the subsidiaries Macy's, Bloomingdale's, and the beauty store chain Bluemercury, all of which have a flagship store located in the New York City borough of Manhattan. As of October 29, 2022, the company operated 722 locations (783 boxes, including 540 full-line boxes) in the United States, Guam, and Puerto Rico. Its namesake locations and related operations account for 90% of its revenue. According to Deloitte, Macy's, Inc. is the world's largest fashion goods retailer and the 36th largest retailer overall, based on the company's reported 2010 retail sales revenue of $25 billion (equivalent to $ in ).

Operations as Federated

Early history 
Federated Department Stores traces its corporate lineage to F&R Lazarus & Company, founded in Columbus, Ohio, in 1851. In the summer of  1929, months before the Wall Street Crash of 1929, Fred Lazarus Jr. met with Walter N. Rothschild from Abraham & Straus of Brooklyn and Edward Filene from Filene's of Boston on Rothschild's yacht in Long Island Sound. The three businessmen agreed to merge their stores and form Federated Department Stores, as a department store holding company for F&R Lazarus & Company (including its Cincinnati division, then known as Shillito's), Abraham & Straus, and William Filene's Sons of Boston. In 1930, Bloomingdale Brothers of New York joined.

In the mid-1930s, a modern merchandising standard was set when Fred Lazarus Jr. arranged garments in groups of a single size with a range of style, color and price, basing the technique upon observations made in Paris. As well, Lazarus convinced President Franklin D. Roosevelt that it would help American economy to change the Thanksgiving holiday from the last Thursday of November to the fourth Thursday, thus extending the Christmas shopping season. An act of Congress perpetuated the arrangement in 1941. Black Friday became a nationwide sensation and the most profitable day for Federated. (Robert Lazarus Jr. worked at Federated until he died in 2013, the last remaining family member with an official role at the company.)

In 1945, Federated moved its corporate offices to Cincinnati. The latter half of the 20th century saw the company expand nationwide, adding Rike Kumler of Dayton, Ohio (merged into Shillito's in the 1980s to become Shillito-Rike's); Burdines of Miami, Florida; Rich's of Atlanta, Georgia; Foley's of Houston, Texas; Sanger Brothers and A. Harris, both of Dallas, Texas (which were merged to form Sanger-Harris); Boston Store of Milwaukee, Wisconsin; MainStreet of Chicago, Illinois; Bullock's, of Los Angeles; I. Magnin, of San Francisco, California; Gold Circle; and Richway Discount Department Stores of Worthington, Ohio. Federated entered the supermarket industry in 1968 when it acquired the Ralphs chain based in Southern California. In 1982, Federated acquired the Twin Fair, Inc. discount store chain based in Buffalo, New York, and merged it with Gold Circle. In 1983, Federated sold four shopping center properties to JMB Realty.

Takeover by Robert Campeau 
Canadian real estate developer Robert Campeau – who had taken over and dismembered Allied Stores in 1986 – attempted to take over Federated starting in early 1988 which Federated fought off in a high-profile battle, with Macy's (at that time not part of Federated, but a rival), also submitting competitive bids of over $6 billion. Nonetheless, in April 1988, Federated gave in and agreed to a $6.6 billion takeover by Campeau. It was the largest merger in corporate history, barring the oil sector. Macy's paid Campeau $1.1 billion to acquire the 20-store Bullock's/Bullocks Wilshire and the 25-store specialty apparel chain I. Magnin. Two years later, Federated filed for bankruptcy after Campeau failed to refinance the debt of Federated and Allied Stores Corp. In 1992, Campeau was ousted and Federated emerged from bankruptcy as a new public company. As part of the reorganization, Federated sold the Ralphs chain to a group of owners led by Edward J. DeBartolo Corporation.

Acquisition of Macy's 
Also in 1992, Macy's declared bankruptcy; Federated acquired it two years later, in 1994. The name of the once-main-rival of Federated, Macy's, would soon become the consumer-facing identity of most of Federated's stores.

In 1995 Federated bought Broadway Stores, Inc. and its California-based Emporium-Capwell, Weinstock's and The Broadway chains. Macy's changed the nameplate of these three chains and Bullock's to Macy's, or in some cases, turned locations into Bloomingdales. In 2003, Federated changed the nameplates of almost all their remaining non-Macy's stores – the lone exception was Bloomingdales – to include the Macy's name, a rebranding internally dubbed Project Hyphen. For example, Seattle-based The Bon Marché became Bon-Macy's; Goldsmith's in Tennessee became Goldsmith's-Macy's; Lazarus, Burdines, and Rich's also added "-Macy's" to their name. A year later, the hyphenated names were changed to simply Macy's, a rebranding process referred internally to as Project Star.

The department store chain Stern's, a division of Federated, ceased operations in 2001 and most of its stores became Macy's stores.

Federated began selling goods online in 1998, rather later than most contemporary large retailers; Federated ran a private bank, FDS Bank, which issued and maintained the majority of its own consumer credit card portfolio, was one of the last credit card banks to begin to allow its cardholders to access account information online (around 2004).

In 1998, Federated settled an SEC investigation for $14.46 million (equivalent to $ in ) due to unethical debt-collection practices. Federated routinely forced credit card holders/debtors to sign an agreement that legally bound them to repay their outstanding balances instead of having the unsecured debt discharge via the filing of bankruptcy. Federated failed to file reaffirmation agreements with bankruptcy courts. As a result, the changes in the agreements were not legally binding.

In 2001 Federated acquired Liberty House of Hawaii as it emerged from Chapter 11 bankruptcy. It was managed as part of Macy's West and all the store names were changed to Macy's.

In 2005, Federated agreed to sell its credit card business to Citigroup.

Acquisition of May 

On February 28, 2005, Federated Department Stores announced that it would acquire May Department Stores company for $11 billion (equivalent to $ in ) in cash and stock. Also part of the buyout was the bridal and formal unit of May, consisting of David's Bridal and After Hours Formalwear. Federated would also assume $6 billion (equivalent to $ in ) of May's debt, bringing total consideration to $17 billion (equivalent to $ in ). The deal would create the nation's largest department store chain with over 1,000 stores and $30 billion (equivalent to $ in ) in annual sales. To help finance the deal, Federated agreed to sell its combined proprietary credit card business (but still administered by FACS Group, a subsidiary of Federated) to Citigroup. The merger was completed on August 30, 2005, after an assurance agreement was reached with the Attorneys General of New York, California, Massachusetts, Maryland, and Pennsylvania.

As a result of the merger, Federated also in the process reacquired two of their former department store chains Foley's & Filene's (Which Federated originally sold to May Company), putting them back under the Federated Department Stores corporate umbrella for the first time since 1988.

Federated announced plans to sell 80 store locations in 2006, having pledged in its settlement to sell most of them as viable businesses, with preference being given to a group of thirteen competitors. This number could fluctuate pursuant to Federated's negotiations with various mall landlords and its final decision regarding using former Macy locations for its luxury Bloomingdale's operation.

On January 12, 2006, Federated announced its plans to divest May Company's Lord & Taylor division (48 stores in 12 states) by the end of 2006 after utilizing prime and conflicting real estate by closing and converting several locations. On June 22, 2006, Macy's announced that NRDC Equity Partners, LLC would purchase Lord & Taylor for US$1.2 billion (equivalent to $ in ), and completed the sale in October 2006.

On September 9, 2006, the former May Company store names Famous-Barr, Filene's, Foley's, Hecht's, The Jones Store, Kaufmann's, L. S. Ayres, Marshall Field's, Meier & Frank, Robinsons-May, and Strawbridge's disappeared as Federated switched most of them to the Macy's masthead and a few to the Bloomingdale's name. The conversion of Marshall Field's in Chicago was particularly criticized, with many customers boycotting its historic State Street flagship store. The Chicago Tribune continues to report on the poor reception of Macy's in Chicago. Pittsburgh customers also strongly resisted the name change from Kaufmann's, in part because of the Kaufmann family role in Pittsburgh history, as well as the central store's Christmas windows and holiday parade.

One of the consequences of this rebranding is that several malls have two Macy's stores. In downtown Boston, Federated liquidated an acquired Filene's because it already had a Macy's (formerly a Jordan Marsh) across the street.

On November 17, 2006, the bridal and formal unit was sold. David's Bridal and Priscilla of Boston were sold to Leonard Green & Partners. After Hours Formalwear was sold to Men's Wearhouse.

Operations as Macy's, Inc. 

On February 27, 2007, Federated announced that its board of directors would ask shareholders to change the company's name to Macy's Group, Inc. By March 28, the company revised its plans for the new name, opting to eventually become Macy's, Inc. Federated shareholders approved the revised proposal during the company's annual meeting on May 18, 2007. The company was previously known as Federated Retail Holdings, Inc.

The name took effect on June 1, 2007.  The reasoning for the proposed name change—according to Terry Lundgren, Federated's chairman, president, and chief executive officer—hinges on the large-scale conversions throughout the company toward the Macy's nameplate. "Today, we are a brand-driven company focused on Macy's and Bloomingdale's, not a federation of department stores," Lundgren said in the company's press release heralding the proposed name.  Upon the change to Macy's Inc., Federated's stock ticker symbol on the New York Stock Exchange changed from "FD" to "M", making the new Macy's Inc. one of a handful of single-letter ticker symbol companies.

In April 2008, Moody's Investors Service said that it might downgrade Macy's Inc. bonds to just above junk status. That same month, Fitch Ratings downgraded their bond credit rating to BBB− from BBB, noting a deterioration in the company's operating and credit metrics. A rating of BBB− is one notch above junk status.

The domain macysinc.com attracted at least 3 million visitors annually by 2008, according to a Compete.com survey.

On Wednesday, February 6, 2008, Terry Lundgren announced the localization strategy and the company's plan to shed 2,550 jobs.  This new localization strategy is known as "My Macy's."

Employees of the Macy's North headquarters office in Minneapolis, the Macy's Northwest headquarters office in Seattle, and the Macy's Midwest headquarters office in St. Louis were given pink slips, as Macy's pared its seven regional centers to four. About 40 new jobs were to be created in May as part of the restructuring. By 2009, the company expected to save $100 million (equivalent to $ in ) a year from the cuts.

On February 2, 2009, Macy's announced the elimination of 7,000 jobs, or 4% of its workforce, and slashed its dividend as it looked to lower expenses as part of a major restructuring.
Cincinnati-based Macy's Inc. said the workforce reduction includes positions in offices, stores, and other locations. The cuts will include some unfilled jobs. 
"Reducing our workforce is an unfortunate outcome of the current economic environment, and I am frustrated that so many of our people will be unable to move forward with us as we proceed into a very exciting future for Macy's and Bloomingdale's" said Terry J. Lundgren, chairman, president and chief executive officer. "

Macy's also got rid of its division structure and integrated its functions into one organization. Macy's central buying, merchandise planning, stores senior management and marketing functions merged to its New York City corporate office (formerly Macy's East). Corporate-related business functions, such as finance and human resources, will be primarily in Cincinnati. To buy with local consumers in mind, Macy's developed a concept called "My Macy's", in which the buyers and planners all look at what the local consumer base is looking for in their local Macy's store.  This will help bring a better sense of branding, sizing, and marketing to each Macy's store nationwide.

Macy's Inc. decided to close the Bloomingdale's at the Mall of America in Minnesota. Since 1994, Bloomingdale's had been one of the 4 anchor stores of the mall, and will be replaced with a $30 million renovation with four new foreign clothing stores.

On October 14, 2013, Macy's Inc. announced the decision to open most of their stores for the first time on Thanksgiving Day 2013, breaking a long-standing tradition of 155 years, and joined the ranks of retailers who created Gray Thursday the year before. Its doors opened at 8 p.m. (local time) on the holiday evening, and remained open for 24 hours straight until the close of business on Friday, which is usually about 10 p.m.

, Macy's Inc. is valued at US$28 billion.

In September 2015, Macy's announced it would close 40 stores, 5% of its total stores in early 2016. It also announced plans to open 6 additional Macy's Backstage locations. From 2010 to 2015, Macy's had closed 52 stores and opened 12.

In February 2020, Macy's announced that their headquarters in downtown Cincinnati will be closing in the near future with all corporate operations relocating to New York City. This news came after a gradual pulling out of the Cincinnati area with a couple of area store closures and the retirement of a top executive.

In November 2021, Macy's announced the launch of its digital marketplace, which set to debut in the second half of 2022. Macy's will partner with AlixPartners and Mirakl.

Finances

Nameplates

Current

Former

References

External links 

 
1929 establishments in Ohio
Clothing retailers of the United States
Companies based in New York City
Companies listed on the New York Stock Exchange
Holding companies of the United States
Holding companies based in New York City
Private equity portfolio companies
Publicly traded companies based in New York City
Companies that filed for Chapter 11 bankruptcy in 1990
Retail companies established in 1929
Retail companies based in New York City
Retail companies of the United States